Gabrielle Gourdeau (1952 – July 5, 2006) was a writer in Quebec, Canada.

Biography
Born in the Limoilou neighbourhood of Quebec City, Gourdeau received a PhD in French literature from the University of Toronto. She lectured in the Department of Literature at Laval University for a number of years.

In 1992, she received a fellowship grant from Laval University to assist her in writing Analyse du discours narratif, a work of literary criticism.

She contributed to various newspapers including La Presse, Le Devoir and Le Soleil, as well as several literary and cultural journals, notably Arcade.

Gourdeau's 2002 story "Gros Câlisse" led to a suit for defamation by a former colleague from Laval University, who claimed that a character based on him was portrayed in a derogatory fashion in that work of fiction. On the other hand, Gourdeau herself claimed that the character was not based entirely on that specific person. However, she did not deny that actions by that person may have played a part in her departure from the university.

References 

1952 births
2006 deaths
Canadian newspaper journalists
Canadian novelists in French
Canadian non-fiction writers in French
University of Toronto alumni
Academic staff of Université Laval
Writers from Quebec City
Canadian women journalists
Canadian women essayists
Canadian women novelists
20th-century Canadian essayists
20th-century Canadian novelists
20th-century Canadian women writers